The 2018 African U-20 Women's World Cup Qualifying Tournament was the 9th edition of the African U-20 Women's World Cup Qualifying Tournament, the biennial international youth football competition organised by the Confederation of African Football (CAF) to determine which women's under-20 national teams from Africa qualify for the FIFA U-20 Women's World Cup.

Players born on or after 1 January 1998 are eligible to compete in the tournament. Two teams qualify from this tournament for the 2018 FIFA U-20 Women's World Cup in France as the CAF representatives.

Teams
A total of 19 (out of 54) CAF member national teams entered the qualifying rounds. The draw was announced by the CAF on 15 June 2017.

Notes
Teams in bold qualified for the World Cup.

Did not enter

Format
Qualification ties are played on a home-and-away two-legged basis. If the aggregate score is tied after the second leg, the away goals rule is applied, and if still tied, the penalty shoot-out (no extra time) is used to determine the winner.

Schedule
The schedule of the qualifying rounds is as follows.

Bracket
The two winners of the third round qualify for the 2018 FIFA U-20 Women's World Cup.

Preliminary round

|}

Burundi won 8–1 on aggregate.

Sierra Leone won on walkover after Libya withdrew.

Kenya won on walkover after Botswana withdrew prior to the second leg for financial reasons.

First round

|}

Burundi won on walkover after Rwanda withdrew.

South Africa won 9–0 on aggregate.

Morocco won 3–2 on aggregate.

Nigeria won 9–0 on aggregate.

Sierra Leone won on walkover after Tunisia withdrew.

Cameroon won on walkover after Guinea withdrew prior to the second leg.

Ghana won 10–0 on aggregate.

Kenya won 4–3 on aggregate.

Second round

|}

South Africa won 5–2 on aggregate.

Nigeria won 6–2 on aggregate.

Cameroon won on walkover after Sierra Leone withdrew.

Ghana won 10–1 on aggregate.

Third round
Winners qualify for 2018 FIFA U-20 Women's World Cup.

|}

Nigeria won 8–0 on aggregate.

Ghana won 4–1 on aggregate.

Qualified teams for FIFA U-20 Women's World Cup
The following two teams from CAF qualified for the 2018 FIFA U-20 Women's World Cup.

1 Bold indicates champions for that year. Italic indicates hosts for that year.

Goalscorers
10 goals

 Princella Adubea
 Rasheedat Ajibade

6 goals

 Linda Motlhalo

5 goals

 Falonne Nahimana

4 goals

 Anam Imo

3 goals

 Olivia Anokye
 Helena Obeng
 Vivian Corazone
 Gift Monday
 Gabriela Salgado

2 goals

 Alexandra Takounda
 Dolores Tsadjia
 Mirkat Feleke
 Ernestina Abambila
 Grace Asantewaa
 Sandra Owusu-Ansah
 Martha Amunyolet
 Marjolen Nekesa
 Charity Reuben
 Lelona Daweti

1 goal

 Leano Atlang
 Asha Djafari
 Charlotte Irankunda
 Erica Kanyamuneza
 Sandrine Niyonkuru
 Aniella Uwimana
 Claudia Dabda
 Soline Djoubi
 Elodie Metho
 Michele Moumazin
 Colette Ndzana
 Marie Ngah
 Kafia Abdourahman Arab
 Alemnesh Geremew
 Vivian Adjei
 Philicity Asuako
 Maureen Khakasa
 Rachael Muema
 Jentrix Shikangwa
 Cynthia Shilwatso
 Diana Wacera
 Soumia Hady
 Sanaâ Mssoudy
 Rania Salmi
 Nouhaila Sedki
 Fatima Tagnaout
 Cynthia Aku
 Peace Efih
 Folashade Ijamilusi
 Lilian Tule
 Haby Baldé
 Maty Cissokho
 Lindokuhle Gladile
 Ntombifikile Ndlovu
 Khanya Xesi

References

External links
African Qualifiers FIFA U-20 WWC- FRANCE 2018, CAFonline.com

2018
Women's U-20 World Cup Qualifying Tournament
Women's U-20 World Cup Qualifying Tournament
African U-20 World Cup Qualifying Tournament
African U-20 World Cup Qualifying Tournament
African U-20 Women's World Cup Qualifying Tournament
African U-20 Women's World Cup Qualifying Tournament
July 2017 sports events in Africa
August 2017 sports events in Africa
September 2017 sports events in Africa
October 2017 sports events in Africa
November 2017 sports events in Africa
January 2018 sports events in Africa